is a Japanese actress and gravure idol who is affiliated with LesPros Entertainment. She is best known for her role as Kiriko Shijima, the main heroine of the Kamen Rider series Kamen Rider Drive.

Biography
Uchida debuted in April 2010. In June 2010, she was selected at the NTV Transgenic 2010. In September 2010, Uchida was a member of Beautiful Lady & Television's BLTravel Fan Event Bust Tour non-certified office unit that was formed in the wake LesPros Entertainment. On November 27, 2013, she was chosen for the selection members of the office certified LesPros Entertainment events Vol.1 to be held on January 25, 2014. On March 21, 2014, Uchida was selected to the regular member one graduating class of the theater company Matsumoto Kazumi. From October 2014, she starred in the TV Asahi tokusatsu series, Kamen Rider Drive as the main heroine, Kiriko Shijima.

Filmography

TV series

Film

Awards

References

External links
 Official profile at LesPros Entertainment 
  

1991 births
Living people
Japanese gravure models
Japanese female models
21st-century Japanese actresses
Japanese television personalities
People from Hachiōji, Tokyo